Lake View Township is a township in Becker County, Minnesota, United States. The population was 1,685 at the 2010 census.

History
Lake View Township was organized in 1872, and named from their scenic views over the many lakes the township contains.

Geography

The southern half of the city of Detroit Lakes is within this township geographically but is a separate entity.

Major highways
  U.S. Route 59
  Minnesota State Highway 34

Lakes
 Abbey Lake
 Buck Lake (east half)
 Cottage Lake
 Curfman Lake (south half)
 Fox Lake
 Glawe Lake
 Johnson Lake
 Lind Lake
 Lake Melissa
 Lake Sallie
 Long Lake (south edge)
 Meadow Lake
 Mill Lake
 Monson Lake
 Mud Lake
 Muscrat Lake
 Muskrat Lake
 Nottage Lake
 Reeves Lake
 Sauers Lake
 Senical Lake
 Slough Lake
 St Clair Lake (south three-quarters)

Adjacent townships
 Detroit Township (north)
 Erie Township (northeast)
 Burlington Township (east)
 Hobart Township, Otter Tail County (southeast)
 Candor Township, Otter Tail County (south)
 Dunn Township, Otter Tail County (southwest)
 Lake Eunice Township (west)
 Audubon Township (northwest)

Cemeteries
The township contains Lakeview Cemetery.

Demographics
At the 2000 census, there were 1,730 people, 662 households and 505 families residing in the township. The racial makeup of the township was 95.66% White, 0.17% African American, 1.16% Native American, 0.29% Asian, 0.06% from other races, and 2.66% from two or more races. Hispanic or Latino of any race were 0.58% of the population.

There were 662 households, of which 34.4% had children under the age of 18 living with them, 68.3% were married couples living together, 4.7% had a female householder with no husband present, and 23.6% were non-families. 19.8% of all households were made up of individuals, and 8.0% had someone living alone who was 65 years of age or older. The average household size was 2.61 and the average family size was 3.00.

27.0% of the population were under the age of 18, 5.5% from 18 to 24, 25.8% from 25 to 44, 28.6% from 45 to 64, and 13.1% who were 65 years of age or older. The median age was 40 years. For every 100 females, there were 105.5 males. For every 100 females age 18 and over, there were 104.0 males.

The median household income was $44,125 and the median family income was $49,063. Males had a median income of $35,625 versus $23,125 for females. The per capita income was $20,025. About 7.7% of families and 10.0% of the population were below the poverty line, including 11.2% of those under age 18 and 11.3% of those age 65 or over.

References
 United States National Atlas
 United States Census Bureau 2007 TIGER/Line Shapefiles
 United States Board on Geographic Names (GNIS)

Townships in Becker County, Minnesota
Townships in Minnesota